Ochtrup is a railway station located in Ochtrup, Germany. The station is located on the Münster–Enschede railway. The train services are operated by Deutsche Bahn.

Train services
The following services currently call at the station:

Local service  Enschede - Gronau - Münster

References

Railway stations in North Rhine-Westphalia